Reuben Harding Wiggins (January 18, 1921 – October 22, 1967) was an American Negro league pitcher in the 1930s.

A native of Paterson, New Jersey, Wiggins played for the New York Black Yankees in 1938. He died in Paterson in 1967 at age 46.

References

External links
 and Seamheads

1921 births
1967 deaths
New York Black Yankees players
Baseball pitchers
Baseball players from Paterson, New Jersey
20th-century African-American sportspeople